Pål Lydersen (born 10 September 1965) is a Norwegian former professional footballer who played as a left-back.

Lydersen played for IK Start, until he was signed by English club Arsenal in November 1991. However, he was unable to oust first-team regulars Lee Dixon and Nigel Winterburn, and played only 16 games in all competitions during his time at the club.

In February 1994, Lydersen went on loan to his old club IK Start for the 1994 Tippeligaen season and the move was made permanent when his contract was terminated by Arsenal in March 1995. He went on to play for Sturm Graz in Austria and then onto Molde, before retiring at the end of the 1999 Tippeligaen season. He also won 20 caps for Norway, scoring one goal.

Honours
 Kniksen award as Defender of the year: 1994

References

1965 births
Living people
Sportspeople from Kristiansand
Norwegian footballers
Association football fullbacks
Norway international footballers
IK Start players
Arsenal F.C. players
Molde FK players
SK Sturm Graz players
Kniksen Award winners
Eliteserien players
Premier League players
Austrian Football Bundesliga players
Norwegian expatriate footballers
Norwegian expatriate sportspeople in England
Expatriate footballers in England
Norwegian expatriate sportspeople in Austria
Expatriate footballers in Austria